Aguja (Spanish for needle) may refer to:
Aguja (Marvel Comics), character in Marvel Comics
Aguja (meat), pork shoulder blade cut
Aguja Formation, geological formation in Texas and Mexico
Aguja Saint Exupery, mountain spear in Patagonia, Argentina
Aguja skate (Bathyraja aguja), species of fish